The House of Yahweh: My Side of the Story is a 2012 book by Kay Hawkins, ex-wife of Yisrayl Hawkins, founder of the House of Yahweh.  The two were married 14 years and the book is based on her experiences with the sect, and more specifically, the man who founded it.

Synopsis
Kay Hawkins was forced to leave the House of Yahweh when her then husband (and leader of the organization) excommunicated her.  She waited 17 years before publishing her story, which the Abilene Reporter News describes as being less of a scathing tell all book, and more of a character study of Yisrayl himself. 

The International Cultic Studies Association describes the book as a treasure trove of primary sources on the legal problems the sect has faced, and "contributes to our understanding of psychological patterns of cult leaders and the people who surround them."

See also
 Governmental lists of cults and sects

References

2012 non-fiction books